Cyprian Keyes Golf Club is a golf club located in Boylston, Massachusetts. There is a 9-hole par three course, as well as an 18-hole championship course on the property. The championship course has received numerous  awards and recognitions. Apart from the courses, there is also a double-ended driving range, practice greens, and a clubhouse.

References

External links 
Official website

Golf clubs and courses in Massachusetts
Sports venues in Worcester County, Massachusetts
1997 establishments in Massachusetts
Sports venues completed in 1997